Gregory J. Britz (born January 3, 1961) is a former American professional ice hockey forward. He played in the National Hockey League (NHL) for the Toronto Maple Leafs and Hartford Whalers.

Early life
Britz was born in Buffalo, New York, but grew up in Marblehead, Massachusetts.

College
After completing St. Michael's College School in Toronto, Ontario, forward Greg Britz enrolled at Harvard University, where he played for the school's hockey team. During his freshman season in the NCAA, Britz played in 26 games, scoring eight goals and 13 points. He had four seasons in the Ivy League and his most productive season came during his senior year, 1982–83, when he tallied 16 goals and 39 points in 33 games.

Professional career
In the fall of 1983, Britz signed a pro contract with the St. Catharines Saints, then the farm team of the Toronto Maple Leafs. He dressed for 44 games with the Saints, compiling 23 goals and 39 points. His strong two-way play caught the eye of the Leafs, who called him up for six games to fill in for injured players. However, he saw limited ice time with the big club and failed to reach the scoresheet.

Britz played another two years with the Saints and played one more game with the Maple Leafs in 1984–84. In 1986–87, Britz joined the Binghamton Whalers, where he had 25 goals and 41 points in 74 games. He also played his final NHL game that year, getting into the lineup of the Hartford Whalers for one game. Britz had an eight-game NHL career and was held pointless with four minutes in penalties.

Career statistics

Regular season and playoffs

References

External links
 

1961 births
Living people
American men's ice hockey forwards
Binghamton Whalers players
Hartford Whalers players
Harvard Crimson men's ice hockey players
Ice hockey players from Massachusetts
People from Marblehead, Massachusetts
St. Catharines Saints players
Ice hockey people from Buffalo, New York
Sportspeople from Essex County, Massachusetts
Toronto Maple Leafs players
Undrafted National Hockey League players